Tony Tan Caktiong,  (born 1953) is a Filipino billionaire businessman. He is the founder and chairman of Jollibee Foods Corporation, and the co-chairman of DoubleDragon Properties.

Early career and education
Tan Caktiong was born to Chinese immigrant parents from Fujian. His father worked in a restaurant in China and as a cook in a Buddhist monastery in Manila before setting up his own restaurant in Davao City Tony Tan Caktiong attended high school at Chiang Kai Shek College and graduated from the University of Santo Tomas with a degree in chemical engineering in 1975. Tan had initially planned an ice cream parlor when he founded Jollibee, then added dishes such as hamburgers, french fries, and fried chicken.

Career

Jollibee Foods Corporation
Tan Caktiong founded the fast food chain Jollibee in 1978, after having started it as an ice cream parlor in 1975. Expansion and acquisition of Greenwich Pizza Corp. enabled it to enter the pizza-pasta segment. In early 2006, Jollibee Foods Corporation bought out the remaining shares of its partners in Greenwich Pizza Corporation, equivalent to a 20% stake, for P384 million in cash.

As of August 2008, Tan Caktiong's Jollibee has a total of 1,480 stores worldwide including Jollibee, Red Ribbon, Chowking, Greenwich, Manong Pepe's and Mang Inasal.

As of November 2015, Forbes estimated his net worth at US$4.1 billion.

DoubleDragon Properties
In 2012, Tan Caktiong, through his holding company, Honeystar Holdings Corporation, invested in Injap Land Corporation, a property company founded by Edgar Sia II. With Tan Caktiong's entry, the company was renamed DoubleDragon Properties Corporation.

Personal life
Tan Caktiong is married to Grace Tan Caktiong. He is also the brother of Ernesto Tanmantiong, who is the President and CEO of Jollibee Foods Corporation.

Awards
Entrepreneur Of The Year Philippines, 2004
Huizenga was named the 2005 Ernst & Young World Entrepreneur Of The Year, 2004
Gawad Mabini with the rank of Commander (Dakilang Kasugo), 2016
Honorary doctorate from the University of Santo Tomas, 2018

See also 
 Alfonso A. Uy
 Edgar Sia
 Jonha Richman
 Emilio Yap
 George T. Yang

References

Jollibee Foods Corporation
Fast-food chain founders
Filipino billionaires
Filipino chief executives
Filipino people of Chinese descent
Living people
University of Santo Tomas alumni
Filipino company founders
1953 births
Filipino chairpersons of corporations